USS Wright may refer to:

, was launched in 1920 as airship tender AZ-1, then converted twice more during her career for various duties until 1946 when she was scrapped
Wright (CV-47), was an Essex-class carrier laid down in August 1944 and renamed  in February 1945, prior to launching
 was a light aircraft carrier commissioned in 1947, converted to a command ship and recommissioned as CC-2 in 1962, and decommissioned in 1970
 is an active Aviation Logistics Support (Roll-on/Roll-off) container ship used by the US Navy Auxiliary

United States Navy ship names